Mladomir Puriša Đorđević (6 May 1924 – 23 November 2022) was a Serbian film director and screenwriter. He directed 71 films since 1947. His 1966 film The Dream was entered into the 17th Berlin International Film Festival. Some of his movies were censored and banned by the Yugoslav communist government.

Đorđević died on 23 November 2022, at the age of 98.

Selected filmography
 Girl (1965)
 The Dream (1966)
 The Morning (1967)
 Noon (1968)

References

External links

1924 births
2022 deaths
Serbian film directors
Serbian screenwriters
Male screenwriters
Golden Arena for Best Director winners
Yugoslav film directors
Yugoslav screenwriters
Writers from Čačak